Happiness Finally Came to Them is a studio album by Ralph Carney, Daved Hild and Kramer, released in 1987 through Shimmy Disc. It was the first album to be issued under any of the three musicians' names, serving as both Carney's and Kramer's launching point for their respective solo careers. Although most of the songs are credited to all three musicians, Hild served as the album's primary songwriter and lyricist.

Track listing

Personnel 
Adapted from Happiness Finally Came to Them liner notes.

Musicians
 Ralph Carney – saxophones, guitars, vocals
 Daved Hild – vocals, drums, percussion
 Kramer – bass guitar, organ, tape, vocals, production, engineering
Additional musicians
 Robin Amos – synthesizer ("Blood Drinking Head Choppers")
 Michael Cudahy – guitar (A3, A4, "Blood Drinking Head Choppers")
 Suzanna Lee – vocals (B2)

Additional musicians (cont.)
 David Licht – percussion (B4, B9)
 Frank London – trumpet ("Blood Drinking Head Choppers")
 Pete Plumbly – guitar (B8)
 Garo Yellin – cello (A8, B4, B9, "Blood Drinking Head Choppers")
Production and additional personnel
 David Larr – art direction
 Michael Macioce – photography

Release history

References

External links 
 

1987 albums
Collaborative albums
Albums produced by Kramer (musician)
Kramer (musician) albums
Ralph Carney albums
Daved Hild albums
Shimmy Disc albums